K-1 World MAX 2014 World Championship Tournament Final was a kickboxing event promoted by K-1 originally scheduled to be held on July 26, 2014 in Pattaya, Thailand, but delayed due to the turbulent political climate in Thailand; it was ultimately held on October 11, 2014.  The winner was Enriko Kehl. 

A controversial event occurred during the fight between Buakaw and Enriko Kehl. After 3 rounds of action, Buakaw left the building without hearing the judges verdict (a 4th round was declared), and so the German fighter was declared winner by forfeit.

Fight Card & Results
 K-1 World Max Final :  Enriko Kehl def.  Buakaw Banchamek via forfeit (extra round)
 Superfight :  Paul Daley def.  Mohammad Ghaedibardeh via unanimous decision (round 3)
 Superfight :  Maximo Suárez def.  Tural Bayramov via TKO (round 2)
 Superfight :  Andre Dida Amade def.  Li Yankun via majority decision (round 3)
 Superfight :  Xie Lei def.  Kouji Yoshimoto via unanimous decision (round 3)
 Superfight :  Petchmankong Petsaman def.  Artem Pashporin via majority decision (round 3)
 Superfight :  Lee Sung-Hyun def.  Andrei Kulebin via unanimous decision (extra round)
 Superfight :  Rungravee Sasiprapa def.  Denis Puric via unanimous decision (round 3)

K-1 World MAX 2014 Bracket

1 Mike Zambidis was set to face Elam Ngor, but he decided to pull himself out due to some terms and conditions disagreements, and was replaced by Ismat Aghazade.
2 Extended Round
3 Andy Souwer withdrew from the tournament due to appendicitis and was replaced by Christopher Mena.
4 Extended Round; Buakaw Banchamek refused to fight and walked out.

See also
List of K-1 events
List of K-1 champions
List of male kickboxers

References

K-1 MAX events
2014 in kickboxing